Mads Døhr Thychosen (born 27 June 1997) is a Danish footballer, who plays as a right-back for FC Midtjylland.

Youth career
Thychosen started playing football when he was two and a half years old in the amateur club Vinding SF. Then, when he was 11 years old, he transferred to Vejle Boldklub, and played there until he was 13, before he transferred back again to Vinding. Once again - one year after - he went back to Vejle at the age of 14.

He was one of the biggest talents ever in Vejle, and played with the youth team of Arsenal at the Ferolli Cup. After that, he trained with them once again in December 2013.

He signed his first contract with Vejle on his 15-years birthday.

Club career

Vejle Boldklub
At the age of only 16, 3 months and 9 days, Thychosen became the youngest debutant ever for Vejle BK, when he replaced Nicolaj Agger in the 82nd minute, in the 2–0 victory against Hvidovre IF on 6 October 2013.

FC Midtjylland
On 25 August 2014, FC Midtjylland signed Thychosen for their U19 squad on a 3-year contract.

At the age of 18, Thychosen got his official debut for FCM on 25 October 2015, in a Superliga match against Brøndby IF. Thychosen started on the bench, but replaced Marco Larsen in the 82nd minute in the match that FCM lost 1–2. The player signed a new 5-year contract in September 2016. FCM wanted to loan him out in the winter 2017, however, he stayed at the club. But after playing no games since November 2016, it was clear that he had to leave the club in the summer of 2017.

On 25 January 2018, Thychosen signed a contract extension.

Loan to AC Horsens
AC Horsens invited Thychosen on a one-week trial in June 2017 and two weeks later the club announced, that they had signed the winger on a loan deal until 31 December 2017.

FC Nordsjælland
On 8 August 2019 FC Nordsjælland announced, that they had signed Thychosen on a 4-year deal.

Return to Midtjylland
On 31 January 2022, Tychosen returned to his former club FC Midtjylland on a deal until June 2025.

Personal life
Thychosens father, Lars Døhr and uncle, Steen Thychosen, is a former footballers, and his two cousins, Oliver Thychosen & Jacob Thychosen, are footballers. Also his little brother, Kasper Thychosen, is a footballer.

His favourite player is Wayne Rooney and his favourite team is Manchester United.

He is a fan of Computer Game Dota 2. He has stated that he had considered playing the game professionally had football not worked out for him.

Honours

Club

FC Midtjylland:

 Danish Cup:  2018–19

References

External links
 
 
 Mads Døhr Thychosen at FCM

1996 births
Living people
Danish men's footballers
Danish Superliga players
Danish 1st Division players
Vejle Boldklub players
FC Midtjylland players
AC Horsens players
FC Nordsjælland players
Denmark youth international footballers
People from Vejle Municipality
Association football defenders
Sportspeople from the Region of Southern Denmark